The Banaut (also known as Bandaut) is a branch of Bundela  Rajput found in the Indian states of Bihar and Jharkhand. They are said to be left orchha and some parts of bundelkhand during Mughal period and migrated to Bihar(now Jharkhand).

Origin and History
Banauts originated from bundelkhand ,but later came to Bihar (now Hazaribagh and chatra districts of jharkhand).As they were from land owning community ,they became wealthy zamindars with time and also had strong political positions.

Culture

Deities
Banaut have their particular village deities such as Hanumanji, Ram-Janaki and Radhakrishna.

Gotra
The gotras of Banaut are Bhardwaj, Dhenu, vaksh, Kaushik, Garg, Sandilya and Vishwamitra.

See also
Babu Saheb

References

Rajput clans of Bihar